Zentla Municipality is a municipality of Veracruz, Mexico. The seat is Colonia Manuel González.

Municipalities of Veracruz